Salar railway station is a railway station on the Howrah–Azimganj line of Howrah railway division of Eastern Railway zone. It is situated at Salar, Murshidabad in the Indian state of West Bengal.

History
In 1913, the Hooghly–Katwa Railway constructed a  broad gauge line from Bandel to Katwa, and the Barharwa–Azimganj–Katwa Railway constructed the  broad gauge Barharwa–Azimganj–Katwa loop. With the construction of the Farakka Barrage and opening of the railway bridge in 1971, the railway communication picture of this line were completely changed. The station electrified in August 2018 . Total 46 trains including number of Express, Passengers and EMU stop at Salar. Distance between Howrah and Salar railway station is approximately 163 km.

Trains
13142/Teesta Torsha Express
13146/Radhikapur–Kolkata Express
15960/Kamrup Express
3164/Hate Bazare Express
15722/Paharia Express
53006/Azimganj–Katwa Passenger
63010/Azimganj–Katwa MEMU
73036/Nimtita–Katwa DEMU
53012/Azimganj–Katwa Passenger (unreserved)
13466/Malda Town–Howrah Intercity Express (via Azimganj)
53014/Azimganj–Katwa Passenger (unreserved)
73032/Azimganj–Katwa DEMU
53008/Rampurhat–Katwa Passenger (unreserved)
53016/Azimganj–Katwa Passenger (unreserved)
73152/Jangipur Road–Sealdah DEMU
53018/Azimganj–Katwa Passenger (unreserved)
53020/Azimganj–Katwa Passenger (unreserved)
13422/Malda Town– Nabadwip Dham Express (unreserved)
53436/Azimganj–Katwa Passenger (unreserved)
53002/Azimganj–Howrah Passenger (unreserved)
13034/Katiha–Howrah Express

Facilities 
The facilities available are waiting rooms, computerized reservation facility, reservation counter, and two-wheeler vehicle parking, ATM Counter, Toilets, Tea Stall.

References

Railway stations in Murshidabad district
Howrah railway division